P. G. Kuruvilla was an Anglican bishop: he was  the fifth bishop of North Kerala.

References

 Church of South India clergy
 Anglican bishops of North Kerala
20th-century Anglican bishops